The 2004 Indiana Hoosiers football team represented Indiana University Bloomington during the 2004 NCAA Division I-A football season. They participated as members of the Big Ten Conference. The Hoosiers played their home games at Memorial Stadium in Bloomington, Indiana. The team was coached by Gerry DiNardo in his third and final year as head coach. At the end of the season, DiNardo was fired and replaced by Terry Hoeppner.

Schedule

Roster

2005 NFL draftees

References

Indiana
Indiana Hoosiers football seasons
Indiana Hoosiers football